Yeyo may refer to:

Terminology
Yeyo, a slang term for cocaine

People
Aurelio Cano Flores (b. 1972), Mexican drug lord, nicknamed "Yeyo"
Alessandro Bertoli (b. 2004), Italian basketball player, nicknamed "Yeyo"